Taylor Dome is an elliptical ice dome, 43 nautical miles (80 km) long ESE-WNW and 16 nautical miles (30 km) wide, rising to 2,400 m, centered about 29 nautical miles (50 km) west-northwest of Mount Crean, Lashly Mountains, Victoria Land on Antarctica. The feature was delineated by the Scott Polar Research Institute (SPRI)-National Science Foundation (NSF)-Technical University of Denmark (TUD) airborne radio echo sounding program, 1967–79. The name was first used by David J. Drewry of SPRI in 1980. The dome is one of the local sources of ice to the Taylor Glacier, from which it is named. Approved by Advisory Committee on Antarctic Names (US-ACAN) in 1994.

Ice caps of Antarctica
Bodies of ice of Oates Land